Madame Freedom (자유부인 - Jayu buin) is a 1956 South Korean film.

Plot
The film opens introducing a professor, Jang, and his wife, Oh Seon-yeong, who have a son together. Oh accepts a job at a boutique, as a cosmetics store manager, to supplement her husband's small income as a professor. Their next door neighbor frequently professes his attraction to her, and she allows him to teach her dancing and introduce her to alcohol. Her boss' husband also begins a flirtation with her which escalates to the point of being found by his wife as they are about to consummate their "dating." Meanwhile, her husband faces a strong attraction to a pretty woman in a grammar class he teaches for secretaries, frequently staying out late walking with her, though he resists her request to take matters further. These extramarital dalliances strain the relationship between the couple. Ultimately, Oh's neglect of their son, coupled with anonymous warnings Jang receives about her behavior, culminate in Jang forcing Oh out of the home. Their son insists to be let outside to see his mother, forcing Jang to acquiesce. The film closes with Oh weeping outside the gate, hugging her son.

Cast
 Park Am... Professor Jang
 Kim Jeong-rim... Oh Seon-yeong
 No Gyeong-hui... Choi Yun-ju
 Joo Sun-tae... Baek Seon-saeng
 Kim Dong-won
 Go Hyang-mi
 Yang Mi-yeong... Park Eun-mi
 An Na-yeong
 Go Seon-ae

Notes

Bibliography
 
 
 

1956 films
1950s Korean-language films
South Korean romantic drama films
South Korean drama films
1956 drama films
South Korean black-and-white films